Sabahattin Cevheri (born 1 January 1950 in Şanlıurfa, Turkey) is a Turkish politician and member of Turkish Parliament. He is a member of the Justice and Development Party (AKP).

Biography 
Sabahattin graduated from Gazi University Department of Economic and Business Sciences, and he was a deputy in the Turkish Parliament for Şanlıurfa.

He is married and has three children.

References 

Living people
Turkish politicians
1950 births
21st-century Turkish politicians